Eyn Khvosh (also Romanized as ‘Eyn Khvosh, ‘Eyn-e Khvosh, Eyn Khūsh, and ‘Eyn-e Khowsh; also known as Chashmeh Khush) is a village in Dasht-e Abbas Rural District, Musian District, Dehloran County, Ilam Province, Iran. At the 2006 census, its population was 709, in 118 families. The village is populated by Arabs.

References 

Populated places in Dehloran County
Arab settlements in llam Province